The Coeur d'Alene Charter Academy is a public charter school that provides college preparatory education for grades 6–12. It was labeled the best school within Idaho by U.S. News & World Report and 115th in the country.

Overview
Coeur d'Alene Charter Academy was founded in 1999 by Dr. William (Bill) Proser. Their mission is "providing a rigorous, content-rich, college preparatory education for any students who are willing to accept the challenge".

Extra-curricular achievement
The primary focus of the high school is academics, with intense math, science, history, and literature programs implemented into the system. Coeur d'Alene Charter Academy students are initially placed one year ahead in math than average curriculum requires, and no classes have a lower standard than college preparatory. Recently, Coeur d'Alene Charter Academy has debuted its academic mastery by becoming Regional Science Bowl Champions, dominating with a superlative Academic Team, and shining with state award-winning Speech and Debate team.

Not only does Coeur d'Alene Charter Academy excel in academics, but their sports and arts programs also exemplify their proficiency. 
The Lady Panthers soccer team has won state competitions multiple times, and the school's Cross Country and Track teams have also succeeded at the state level. In addition, the drama, choir, and band programs continuously excel in their own respective state competitions.
The school has many sports options for girls, including soccer, golf, volleyball, tennis, and track and field, while boys have the options of tennis, soccer, and track and field.

Distinguished alumna 
 Emily Ruskovich, Class of 2004, O. Henry Award Winner and New York Times Bestselling Author

References

External links
 

Charter schools in Idaho
Public high schools in Idaho
Public middle schools in Idaho
1999 establishments in Idaho
Buildings and structures in Coeur d'Alene, Idaho
Schools in Kootenai County, Idaho